Sweden is a country in Northern Europe.  Sweden may also refer to:

Locations
 Sweden (European Parliament constituency), a constituency in the European Parliament

United States
Sweden, Georgia, a ghost town
Sweden, Maine, a town
Sweden, Missouri, an unincorporated community
Sweden, New York, a town
Sweden, South Carolina, an unincorporated community
Sweden Township, Potter County, Pennsylvania

Music
Sweden (album), by The Mountain Goats
"Sweden", a song by C418 from Minecraft – Volume Alpha
"Sweden (All Quiet on the Eastern Front)", a song by The Stranglers from Black and White

See also
 :Category:National sports teams of Sweden
 New Sweden (disambiguation),
 Sverige (disambiguation)